The Paraavis Tango Duett is a Russian two-place paraglider that was designed and produced by Paraavis of Moscow and introduced in 2003. It is now out of production.

Design and development
The Tango Duett was designed as a tandem glider for flight training. It uses a unique biplane arrangement of two rectangular wings.

Variants
Tango Duett 42
Small-sized model for lighter pilots. The glider model is not certified.
Tango Duett 46
Large-sized model for heavier pilots. The glider model is not certified.

Specifications (Tango Duett 46)

References

Tango Duett
Paragliders